Sangli Assembly constituency is one of the 288 Vidhan Sabha (legislative assembly) constituencies of Maharashtra state in western India.

Overview
Sangli constituency is one of the eight Vidhan Sabha constituencies located in the Sangli district.

Sangli is part of the Sangli Lok Sabha constituency along with five other Vidhan Sabha segments in this district, namely Miraj, Khanapur, Palus-Kadegaon, Tasgao-Kavathemahakal and Jat.

Members of Legislative Assembly

See also
 Sangli
 List of constituencies of Maharashtra Vidhan Sabha

References

Assembly constituencies of Maharashtra
Sangli